Petr Glaser (born 30 July 1988) is a Czech football player who currently plays for FK Baník Souš.

Career

Baník Souš
In October 2019 it was confirmed, that Glaser had joined FK Baník Souš.

References

External links
 

1988 births
Living people
Czech footballers
Czech First League players
Czech National Football League players
FC Zbrojovka Brno players
FK Baník Sokolov players
MFK Karviná players
Association football midfielders